The Startup Visa is a temporary conditional residence permit in different countries. It aims at introducing a visa category for entrepreneurs raising outside funding and converts to a permanent residency visa if certain conditions are met.

Startup and entrepreneur visas by country 
Across many developed and some developing countries, there is an interest in attracting entrepreneurs who can bring new knowledge and create jobs within the local economy. Therefore, different countries have implemented specific visas for entrepreneurs and startup founders:

Australia 
Australia created a visa specifically for entrepreneurs back in the 70s. Several categories exist for business owners. Recently a new category called Business Innovation and Investment Visa was added that targets and is attractive to innovative startups.

Canada 
Entrepreneurs and start-up founders are offered the option of a start-up visa for which the rules and funding requirements varie according to the source of funding the business-owner(s) has/have obtained to finance their business. 
The program aims to recruit innovative entrepreneurs to the country by linking them with Canadian angel investor groups, venture capital funds or business incubators to facilitate the establishment of their start-up business in Canada.

Chile 
Entrepreneurs and start-ups founders can apply to Start-up Chile, an accelerator program that support entrepreneurs and innovative businesses. Acceptance to the program will grant applicants with a visa to stay for a year.

Denmark 
2-year work and residence permit for non-EU/EEA founders seeking to start and grow their businesses in Denmark. Focus on high-growth and globally minded entrepreneurs, and permits are given for up to 3 founders for 2 years, renewable for another 3 years thereafter.

Finland
The Finnish Startup Permit makes it possible for international growth entrepreneurs to build a startup company in Finland and to become part of Finland's vibrant startup ecosystem. The permit is meant for innovative startup founders coming from countries outside the European Union.
The permit can initially be issued for max. two years, after which it can be renewed. The permit does not involve investments or financial support.
The permit requires that:

 a startup team of not less than 2 founders with versatile expertise
 an intention of founding a fast growth company in Finland
 an innovative business plan
 commitment to the business idea and eventually building the company
 significant holding in the company (For example the team applying for the permit, has a holding of not less than 60% of the company.)
 access to sufficient resources and funding for the company's early stage development
 secure financial means for support

Estonia 
The Estonian Startup Visa was launched in January 2017 and  helps non-EU founders grow their startup in Estonia. The programme is meant both for startup founders and employees to work in Estonian startups. The programme has attracted more than 2500 people in less than 4 years.

Italy 
Italy introduced a groundbreaking startup visa in June 2014, which is reserved for innovative business ideas (a 'standard' self-employed visa is also available; see below). It offers a simplified visa procedure for entrepreneurs by cutting red-tape and providing a range of tax and labour regulation benefits. To qualify for it, the entrepreneur applicant must prove the innovative character of the business idea ; and show access to €50,000 in investment capital for the business.

Lithuania 
In 2017 in March Lithuania launched a Startup Visa program entrepreneurs from outside the EU to set up operations in Lithuania.

Netherlands 
Startup founders are offered the startup visa - a one year residence permit for the Netherlands - if they satisfy the following criteria:
 Collaboration with a reliable and experienced Netherlands-based facilitator.
 The product or the service is innovative.
 The start-up entrepreneur has a (step-by-step) plan in order to move from idea to business.
 The start-up entrepreneur and the facilitator are both registered in the Trade Register of the Chamber of Commerce.
 There are sufficient financial means (resources) to be able to reside and live in the Netherlands (minimally 13000€).
After the course of the year, the startup entrepreneur may be granted an extended residence permit – as long as they satisfy the standard requirements for the Dutch government's self-employment scheme.

New Zealand 
Entrepreneurs and start-ups founders have now a new option since March 2014, the Entrepreneur Work visa. The visa works in two stages, one to support the settlement in the country and launch of the business. After the first year, the entrepreneur(s) needs to develop the business to be able to stay in the country on the visa.

Singapore 
The length of stay is dependent on the cash-flow generated by the business and its innovative nature.

Spain 
Entrepreneurs are offered a fast tracked resident permit, requiring them to have a government-vetted business plan, health insurance and enough money to support themselves while living in Spain. Visa decisions are promised within 10 working days, and residence permit decisions in 20 days.

United Kingdom 
Entrepreneurs and start-ups founders are offered three visa options depending on their situation and the length of their stay. The Entrepreneur Visa, the Graduate Entrepreneur Visa and the Prospective Entrepreneur Visa.

United States 
In the U.S., the startup visa was a proposed amendment to the U.S. immigration law to create a visa category for foreign entrepreneurs who have raised capital from qualified American investors (Startup Visa Act of 2011, as introduced on March 14, 2011). The Startup Visa Act had bi-partisan support but was not passed into law.

Background 

Foreign entrepreneurs who find themselves wanting to start a company in the United States are faced with no or limited visa options. The few visas offering residency and thus a path to citizenship applicable to entrepreneurs are visa categories such as the EB-1 visa, or the EB-5 visa, which were not designed for entrepreneurs in particular, and can only apply to an extremely limited number of entrepreneurs.
Employment-based visas such as the EB-2 visa are not viable options for entrepreneurs and can be denied on the ground of the applicant owning significant stake in the sponsor company.

Requirements 
The new legislation provides visas to the following groups under certain conditions:

 Entrepreneurs living outside the U.S.—if a U.S. investor agrees to financially sponsor their entrepreneurial venture with a minimum investment of $100,000. Two years later, the startup must have created five new American jobs and either have raised over $500,000 in financing or be generating more than $500,000 in yearly revenue.
 Workers on an H-1B visa, or graduates from U.S. universities in science, technology, engineering, mathematics, or computer science—if they have an annual income of at least $30,000 or assets of at least $60,000 and have had a U.S. investor commit investment of at least $20,000 in their venture. Two years later, the startup must have created three new American jobs and either have raised over $100,000 in financing or be generating more than $100,000 in yearly revenue.
 Foreign entrepreneurs whose business has generated at least $100,000 in sales from the U.S.  Two years later, the startup must have created three new American jobs and either have raised over $100,000 in financing or be generating more than $100,000 in yearly revenue.

Use of existing visa numbers 

The Startup Visa does not allocate any new visa numbers but draws from unused numbers out of the EB-5 visa category (investor green card) which is limited to 9,940 visas, of which only 4,191 visas were used in fiscal year 2009.

The office of Senator Lugar stressed the following statement "The creation of new visas is not authorized in this bill."

In perspective, the U.S. admitted 1.13 million new legal permanent residents in the US in 2009, of which, only 12.7% were admitted through a selective process or "Employment-based" categories.

Legislative history 

 The Startup Visa Act of 2010 was introduced in Senate on February 24, 2010, and was left to expire in the Judiciary Committee at the end of the 111th Congress with no further legislative action having been taken on it.
 In a second attempt, the Startup Visa Act of 2011 was introduced in Senate on March 14, 2011. However, it was again left to expire in the Judiciary Committee at the end of the 112th Congress and not enacted.
 The Startup Visa Act of 2013 has been introduced in the Senate on January 30, 2013 and is currently awaiting Committee review. It has to undergo a review with the respectives Judiciary committees and the Immigration subcommittees of the Senate and the House. According to Govtrack.us, "The majority of bills and resolutions never make it out of committee".

Obama administration 
While the Startup Visa enjoys bi-partisan support and the White House have been repeatedly voicing support to principles relating to it, the Obama Administration have not been aggressively pushing the Startup Visa Act, even through the Startup America initiative, introduced in January 2011. During a conversation hosted by The Economist on March 24, 2011, Aneesh Chopra, the United States CTO, responded the following to Vivek Wadhwa's question about the Startup Visa: "The President has been emphatically clear, his support for high-skill immigration, but to do so as part of a broader, comprehensive immigration reform program".

This approach has drawn criticism from some supporters of the Startup Visa who see the White House as wanting to delay the bill for an undetermined length of time in order to include it in a Comprehensive Immigration Reform broadly covering legal and illegal immigration, viewed as politically "toxic" for the Startup Visa Act.

In the media 
Some actual immigration mishaps which the Startup Visa hopes to address have been covered in the documentary film Starting-Up In America, released on February 28, 2011.

Countries without a specific visa for entrepreneurs

France 
Currently France does offer a resident permit called Compétences et talents (Competencies and Talents) that grants visa for entrepreneurs that "are likely to make a significant or lasting contribution, through their skills or talents, to France's economic development or to its intellectual, scientific, cultural, humanitarian or athletic prestige, and directly or indirectly, to that of their own country".

This said, it is possible and often easier for entrepreneurs that want to start a company in Europe to come under the EU Blue Card or secondment route rather than apply for a Competencies and Talents resident permit.

A new Entrepreneur route was launched in May 2015: the FrenchTech Ticket.

Italy 
In theory, there are two visas options available for an Entrepreneur to start a business in Italy: a groundbreaking startup visa, which is reserved for innovative business ideas (see above); and a 'standard' self-employed visa (residence permit).

Migrant Entrepreneurs to Italy can also choose to enter the country via the 'standard' self-employed visa. The process requires the applicant to apply for a work permit (nulla osta) from within Italy. The applicant therefore must appoint an agent to complete the application in Italy.
 The minimum start up funds for this visa is a mere €4,962.36 but vary depending on the planned business, in contrast to the €50,000 investment required for the Italian Startup Visa. Nevertheless, the applicant must prove that there are no barriers of entry for their startup and in essence work closely with the Italian Chamber of Commerce in order to succeed with their application.

Germany 
Unless a recent graduate in Germany, applicants will have to show access to €500,000 in investment funds and that the business will create at least 5 job opportunities in Germany.
 Cooperation with the German Chamber of Industry and Commerce is required to succeed with the application.

Spain 
Required investment funds depends on the business plan and estimations - the Spanish authorities take decisions on a case by case basis.

Lithuania 
The Startup Visa gives access to migration procedure for temporary residence permit in Lithuania. A temporary residence permit to live in the country for one year, with the possibility to extend for an additional year.

1) The startup must operate in one of the following fields: 
 Biotechnologies
 Nanotechnologies
 Information Technologies
 Mechatronics
 Electronics
 Laser Technologies 2) Applicants must legally be at least a part owner of the newly founded firm.
3) Applicants must have enough financial resources to achieve set business goals for 1 year. EU citizens that want to open a business in Lithuania, do not need a residence permit.

Deciding which entrepreneurs to allow 

Most entrepreneur visas available worldwide are temporary but will eventually lead to residency if the entrepreneur proves to be successful (except Canada, which provides immediate permanent residency). As a general rule, these countries evaluate the entrepreneurial migrant application upon the economic interests the individual's business idea and project it represent for the country's economic growth. Entry requirements and the definition of success vary between countries, though it typically comes down to two key parameters: 
• What level must entrepreneurs and their businesses reach to qualify for entry and residency?
• How quickly the above has to happen?

Most countries assess the potential of an entrepreneur by considering the startup's capital (its amount and source) and the individual's profile (education or business background and/or business proposal). A graph summarising existing entrepreneur visa schemes around the world can help the read and comparison of the different schemes.

The criteria are often modulated and flexible, making it easier for certain individuals to qualify. For example, in New Zealand, the Entrepreneur Work Visa is a three-year work visa that works in two stages (a Start-up stage and a Balance stage) to allow entrepreneurs to enable throughout time that they qualify to the visa. There is also a waive of the initial investment capital requirement for "businesses in science, ICT, or other high value export-oriented sector, which demonstrate a high level of innovation or credible short-term high growth prospects". In Canada, the initial investment required is of $118k if from VCs but only of $45k if from Angels and none if the entrepreneur is accepted in by a business incubator program. Some countries also offer simplified routes for recent graduates from that country - notably Germany and the UK.

In most countries, eligibility to renew entrepreneur visas or to convert to permanent residency is assessed by the number of jobs created by the startup and either the additional investment raised or the revenue created in a specific timeframe. In the UK, for example, entrepreneurs are expected to create two full-time jobs in three years to renew their visa, whereas in Singapore, to be granted a two-year visa extension entrepreneurs must create two local jobs in their first year and four in the second.
Typically, the tight deadlines on reaching these goals are justified by enabling the early identification of genuine businesses. They can, however, have harmful consequences for startups by discouraging risk-taking and preventing entrepreneurs from making rational changes to their business plans that would compromise their visa statuses. It was for precisely for this reason that modifications were made to Ireland's entrepreneur visa program. These changes removed the requirement on job creation, on the basis that, for some businesses, it can take longer to get off the ground than others.

Alternatives

Blueseed 

A company called Blueseed aims to create a startup community located on a vessel moored in international waters near the coast of Silicon Valley in the United States. The promoters believe that the location would enable non-U.S. startup entrepreneurs to work on their ventures without the need for a US work visa, while living in proximity to Silicon Valley and using relatively easier to obtain business and tourism visas. This workaround has been compared to the Startup Visa as it aims to accomplish similar goals. Craig Montuori, an evangelist for the Startup Visa, writes of Blueseed that "I can vouch for their passion on creating workarounds for jobs creating foreign entrepreneurs while waiting for Congress to create a Startup Visa as someone who has been advocating for Startup Visa for the past year."

References

External links 
 Full Text of the StartUp Visa Act of 2011 
 UK Entrepreneur Visa Report: An evaluation of the UK Entrepreneur visa implementation and results

United States federal immigration and nationality legislation